Cubebol is a natural sesquiterpene alcohol first identified in cubeb oil.  It is also found in basil. It was patented as a cooling agent in 2001 by Firmenich, an international flavor company. The taste of cubebol is cooling and refreshing. 
The patent describes application of cubebol as a refreshing agent in various products, ranging from chewing gum to sorbets, drinks, toothpaste, and gelatin-based confectioneries.

References

Cooling flavors
Tertiary alcohols
Sesquiterpenes
Cyclopropanes
Cyclopentanes
Isopropyl compounds